This is a list of singles that have peaked in the top 10 of the Billboard Hot 100 during 1958.

Top-ten singles

1959 peaks

References

See also
 1958 in music
 List of Billboard number-one singles of 1958

1958
United States Hot 100 Top 10